Barbara Horawianka (born 14 May 1930) is a Polish film actress. She has appeared in more than 35 films and television shows since 1955.

Selected filmography
 Tonight a City Will Die (1961)
 Passenger (1963)
 Stawka większa niż życie (1967)

References

External links

1930 births
Living people
Polish film actresses
Polish stage actresses
People from Katowice
20th-century Polish actresses
Knights of the Order of Polonia Restituta
Recipients of the Silver Cross of Merit (Poland)
Recipients of the Silver Medal for Merit to Culture – Gloria Artis